Georgy Ketoyev (born 19 November 1985 in Tbilisi, Georgian SSR) is a Russian naturalized Armenian freestyle wrestler of Ossetian descent. He won a bronze medal at the 2008 Summer Olympics, beaten by Revaz Mindorashvili of Georgia whom Ketoev had previously beaten.

The Russian took the gold medal at the World Championship in Baku (2007) in the 84 kg category, by defeating Jousop Abdusalomov of Tajikistan. It was Ketoev's first time as a world teamer. He won the spot on the Russian team over past World Champions Sazhid Sazhidov and Adam Saitiev. Ketoev won the Junior World Championship in 2005 and had only one finish below first in world-level competition, which was a second-place finish in 2005 at the World Cup.

Ketoev took the silver medal at the European Championship in Vilnius (2009) in the 96 kg weight class, losing to Khetag Gazyumov from Azerbaijan in the finals.

References
The Official Website of the Beijing 2008 Olympic Games

External links
 

Male sport wrestlers from Georgia (country)
Olympic wrestlers of Russia
Wrestlers at the 2008 Summer Olympics
Wrestlers at the 2016 Summer Olympics
Olympic bronze medalists for Russia
Sportspeople from Tbilisi
1985 births
Living people
Olympic medalists in wrestling
Medalists at the 2008 Summer Olympics
World Wrestling Championships medalists
Russian male sport wrestlers